Eden Township is the name of some places in the U.S. state of Michigan:

Eden Township, Lake County, Michigan
Eden Township, Mason County, Michigan

See also 
 Eden Township (disambiguation)

Michigan township disambiguation pages